Tadef Subdistrict  is a subdistrict of al-Bab District in northern Aleppo Governorate, northwestern Syria. Administrative centre is Tadef. At the 2004 census, the subdistrict had a population of 41,951.

Cities, towns and villages

References 

Al-Bab District
Rai